Easy Does It is the third studio album by American jazz pianist Bobby Timmons, recorded in 1961 and released on the Riverside label.

Reception
The DownBeat reviewer described it as "a model of unaffected, driving trio jazz". The AllMusic review by Scott Yanow awarded the album 4 stars, stating that "the music is excellent".

Track listing
All compositions by Bobby Timmons except as indicated
 "Easy Does It"4:53 
 "Old Devil Moon" (E.Y. Harburg, Burton Lane)4:38 
 "A Little Busy"5:52 
 "I Don't Stand a Ghost of a Chance with You" (Bing Crosby, Ned Washington, Victor Young)4:54 
 "Pretty Memory"3:32 
 "If You Could See Me Now" (Tadd Dameron, Carl Sigman)6:31 
 "I Thought About You" (Johnny Mercer, Jimmy Van Heusen)5:01 
 "Groovin' High" (Dizzy Gillespie)3:33 
Recorded in New York City on March 13, 1961.

Personnel
Bobby Timmonspiano   
Sam Jonesbass 
Jimmy Cobbdrums

References

Riverside Records albums
Bobby Timmons albums
1961 albums
Albums produced by Orrin Keepnews